Kappo Masa is a Japanese restaurant located within the Gagosian Gallery, on Madison Avenue, in the Upper East Side neighborhood of New York City.

Conceived as a venture between Michelin-starred chef Masa Takayama and art dealer Larry Gagosian, Kappo Masa sells a range of specialty small-plate dishes as well as an omakase menu, served at the restaurant’s dining counter, made by New York City-based craftsman Andre Joyau. The space, occupying what was once a bank vault, features art works by the likes of Andy Warhol, Cy Twombly, and Pablo Picasso.

Background

Prior to opening Kappo Masa, chef Takayama has opened two other major ventures, beginning in 2004 with his eponymous three Michelin-starred restaurant, Masa, in the Time Warner Center at Columbus Circle in New York City, and subsequently with barMASA in the Aria Resort & Casino on The Strip in Las Vegas, Nevada. As a Masa regular with a long-standing interest in the hospitality world, art dealer Larry Gagosian conceived of the partnership with Takayama, as a way to expand the exposure of his contemporary and modern art gallery.

In 2012, Takayama began collaborating with New York City-based designer Preeti Sriratana, managing director of MNDPC, to design Kappo Masa restaurant. The concept was to present Chef Masa’s take on a traditional Japanese menu in a modern and casual setting. The design of the space features materials found in traditional Japanese architecture, such as teak wood and volcanic oya stone, as well as works of art from the Gagosian Gallery’s collection.

References

Restaurants in Manhattan
Restaurants established in 2014
Japanese restaurants in the United States
2014 establishments in New York City